Liljegren Records / CMSweden is a Swedish heavy metal music record label founded by Christian Liljegren (formerly of Narnia) in 1997. The label was originally titled C.L. Music and Distribution but was changed later. Notable current and former groups on the labels roster include Divinefire, Majestic Vanguard, Veni Domine, Crimson Moonlight, ReinXeed, Sanctifica and Pantokrator.

Current roster
Charlie Shred
Golden Resurrection
Morning Dwell
Oriz

Former roster
Crimson Moonlight (active)
Divinefire (active)
Essence of Sorrow
Heel
Majestic Vanguard (active)
Mirador
Miseration (active)
Oratorio
Pantokrator (active)
Parakletos
ReinXeed (active)
Sanctifica (disbanded)
Sons of Thunder
Veni Domine (disbanded)

External links
 Official website
Discogs profile

Swedish record labels